Notoreas ortholeuca is a species of moth in the family Geometridae. It is endemic to New Zealand.

Taxonomy
This species was first described in 1923 by George Hudson using material collected by F. S. Oliver at Stoney Peak, Glenorchy near Lake Wakatipu. Hudson discussed and illustrated this species in his 1928 book The Butterflies and Moths of New Zealand. The genus Notoreas was reviewed in 1986 by R. C. Craw and the placement of this species within it was confirmed. However species within the genus Notoreas are currently regarded as being in need of revision. The holotype specimen was held in F. S. Oliver's collection and has since been lost.

Description

Hudson described the species as follows:

Distribution
N. ortholeuca is endemic to New Zealand. Along with its type locality of Stoney Peak, N. ortholeuca has also been found in other mountainous areas in Central Otago including at the Obelisk Station and in the Dansey Ecological District including in the Kakanui Mountains.

Life cycle and behaviour

The female moth lays her eggs within the flower buds of their host plant. When the larvae emerge from their eggs, they eat into the leaves or buds of their host, hiding from predators. Once they are large enough, they emerge to feed from the fresh growth of the plant. N. ortholeuca pupate in a loose cocoon on the ground under their host. N. ortholeuca are day-flying moths. They are low but fast flyers and constantly vibrate their wings to enable them to take off rapidly. Adults are on the wing in January, February and March.

Habitat and host species
This moth species prefers to live in high alpine habitat and have been found in fellfields. The host plants for the larvae of N. ortholeuca are endemic species within the genus Kelleria including Kelleria childii.

References

Larentiinae
Moths described in 1923
Moths of New Zealand
Endemic fauna of New Zealand
Taxa named by George Hudson
Endemic moths of New Zealand